Melody Tan Yong Xin (born February 10, 1993), is a Malaysian singer who rose to fame after becoming a contestant in the third season of The Voice of China in 2014.

Biography
Tan was born in 1993 in New Zealand, and at the age of three, she followed her parents to live in Malaysia. In 2013, she studied at the College of Music at Guangxi Arts Institute, and won an intra-school competition. In the same year, she took part in Guangxi Television's reality show Challenge the Champion, in which she imitated Christina Aguilera. She also sang in a hotel, and received a higher pay than others as she is from Malaysia.

In 2014, Tan took part in the third season of The Voice of China, and sang Wang Leehom's "The Things You Don't Know" (你不知道的事) during the blind auditions. She was admitted to Yang Kun's team, where she made it to second place in his team, after Yu Feng.

Personal life
In July 2014, Melody revealed that she had a boyfriend. In September 2014, she was rumored to be in a relationship with fellow contestant Liu Ke, after singing Valen Hsu's "If The Clouds Know" (如果云知道) during the battle round and embracing each other for 20 seconds.(Melody herself said that this is a false rumor)

Filmography

MV

Discography

Singles

Accolades

References

External links

 
 

1993 births
Living people
Citizens of Malaysia through descent
Malaysian people of Chinese descent
21st-century Malaysian women singers
The Voice of China contestants